The 73d Space Group  is an inactive United States Air Force space surveillance organization. Its last assignment was with Fourteenth Air Force, being stationed at Falcon Air Force Base, Colorado. It was inactivated on 26 April 1995.

The Group performed space surveillance. In April 1995 the 73d Space Surveillance Group merged with the 21st Space Wing. From that point the 21st became the largest wing in the United States Air Force with units deployed throughout the world.

History
The group was first organized at Ent Air Force Base, Colorado on 1 January 1967 as the 73d Aerospace Surveillance Wing, joining the 71st Surveillance Wing as one of the two wings in Air Defense Command's 9th Aerospace Defense Division, which was responsible for the Air Force's contribution to the defense of North America to space oriented attack.  The 71st Wing, which was soon renamed the 71st Missile Warning Wing, was responsible for the Ballistic Missile Early Warning System, while the 73rd focused on space based systems.  The wing's operational elements were the 16th Surveillance Squadron at Shemya Air Force Station, Alaska, the 17th Surveillance Squadron at Moorestown Air Force Station, New Jersey, the 18th Surveillance Squadron at Edwards Air Force Base, California. the 19th Surveillance Squadron at Pirinclik Air Station, Turkey and the 20th Surveillance Squadron at Eglin Air Force Base, all organized the same day as the wing. Sensor operations included the Spacetrack System. The wing was inactivated in April 1971.

The 73rd was reactivated on 1 March 1989 as the 73d Space Surveillance Group.  On 1 October 1992, Detachment 3 at Misawa Air Base, Japan (which had been added on 1 January 1991) was expanded to form the 3rd Space Surveillance Squadron. It was inactivated in April 1995.

Lineage
 Established as the 73d Aerospace Surveillance Wing and activated on 1 November 1966
 Organized on 1 January 1967
 Inactivated on 30 April 1971
 Redesignated 73d Space Surveillance Group on 10 February 1989
 Activated on 1 March 1989
 Redesignated 73d Space Wing on 1 June 1991
 Redesignated 73d Space Group on 1 May 1992
 Inactivated on 26 April 1995

Assignments
 Air Defense Command, 1 November 1966 (not organized)
 9th Aerospace Defense Division, 1 January 1967
 Fourteenth Aerospace Force, 1 July 1968 – 30 April 1971
 Air Force Space Command, 1 March 1989
 1st Space Wing, 1 June 1991
 Fourteenth Air Force, 20 September 1993 – 26 April 1995

Stations
 Ent Air Force Base, Colorado, 1 January 1967
 Tyndall Air Force Base, Florida, 17 July 1967 – 30 April 1971
 Falcon Air Force Base, Colorado, 1 March 1989 – 26 April 1995

Components
 1st Command and Control Squadron: 28 February 1992 – 24 June 1994
 1st Deep Surveillance Squadron (later, 1st Surveillance Squadron, 1st Space Surveillance Squadron: 1 April 1989 – 26 April 1995
 3rd Space Surveillance Squadron: 1 October 1992 – 26 April 1995
 4th Surveillance Squadron (later 4th Space Surveillance Squadron): 1 October 1990 – 26 April 1995
 5th Surveillance Squadron (later 5th Space Surveillance Squadron): 1 October 1990 – 26 April 1995
 16th Surveillance Squadron (later 16th Space Surveillance Squadron): 1 January 1967 – 30 April 1971, 1 September 1991 – 1 October 1994
 17th Surveillance Squadron (later 17th Space Surveillance Squadron): 1 January 1967 – 31 December 1969, 15 November 1993 – 26 April 1995
 18th Surveillance Squadron (later 18th Space Surveillance Squadron): 1 January 1967 – 30 April 1971, 1 July 1991 – 26 April 1995
 19th Surveillance Squadron (later 19th Space Surveillance Squadron): 1 January 1967 – 30 April 1971, 1 October 1991 – 26 April 1995
 20th Surveillance Squadron (later 20th Space Surveillance Squadron): 1 January 1967 – 30 April 1971, 1 August 1991 – 26 April 1995
 73d Operations Support Squadron: 15 May 1992 – 26 April 1995
 73d Support Squadron (later 73d Mission Support Squadron): 15 May 1992 – 26 April 1995

Detachments
Detachment 1 – San Vito dei Normanni Air Station, Italy (1 October 1989 – 1 October 1990)
Detachment 2 – RAF Feltwell, United Kingdom (1 October 1989 – 1 October 1990)
Detachment 3: Misawa Air Base, Japan (1 January 1991 – 1 October 1992)

References

Notes
 Explanatory notes

 Citations

Bibliography

 
 
 
 Information compiled by Daniel L. Haulman, Phd; Chief, Organizational Histories Branch; Air Force Historical Research Agency

073